Elections to Brentwood Borough Council was held on 4 May 2006.  One third of the council were up for election.  The Conservative Party retained control the council.

After the election, the composition of the council was
 Conservative 27
 Liberal Democrat 7
 Labour 3

Election result

The swing was 4.8% from the Liberal Democrats to the Conservatives.

Ward results

Composition of expiring seats before election

External links
 Results on council website (PDF)
 Brentwood Council

2006
2006 English local elections
2000s in Essex